In enzymology, an inulosucrase is an enzyme that catalyzes the chemical reaction

sucrose + (2,1-beta-D-fructosyl)n  glucose + (2,1-beta-D-fructosyl)n+1

Thus, the two substrates of this enzyme are sucrose and (2,1-beta-D-fructosyl)n, whereas its two products are glucose and (2,1-beta-D-fructosyl)n+1.

This enzyme belongs to the family of glycosyltransferases, specifically the hexosyltransferases.  The systematic name of this enzyme class is sucrose:2,1-beta-D-fructan 1-beta-D-fructosyltransferase. This enzyme is also called sucrose 1-fructosyltransferase.

References

 
 
 

EC 2.4.1
Enzymes of unknown structure